Triblade may refer to:

 A bayonet or knife with three cutting edges
 A helicopter rotor having three blades
 A blade server module of the IBM Roadrunner supercomputer